William James Ellis (July 9, 1857 – April 17, 1926) was a building contractor and political figure in Newfoundland. He represented Ferryland in the Newfoundland and Labrador House of Assembly from 1904 to 1909 as a Liberal. Ellis was the third mayor of St. John's from 1910 to 1914.

Biography
He was born in St. John's and apprenticed as a stonemason with his father. Ellis later established his own contracting and construction business and also operated a quarry. His company rebuilt a number of buildings in St. John's following the Great Fire of 1892. He served as a member of the city council for St. John's from 1902 to 1910. He was defeated when he ran for reelection to the Newfoundland assembly in 1909 and 1913. Ellis was named to the Legislative Council in 1917 and served until 1926; he served as a minister without portfolio in the Executive Council from 1918 to 1926. He died in New York City at the age of 68 while returning from a winter holiday in California.

References 

Members of the Newfoundland and Labrador House of Assembly
Mayors of St. John's, Newfoundland and Labrador
1857 births
1926 deaths
Members of the Legislative Council of Newfoundland
Government ministers of the Dominion of Newfoundland
Newfoundland Colony people